Lagrida is a genus of longhorn beetles of the subfamily Lamiinae.

 Lagrida aenea Hintz, 1919
 Lagrida nitida Breuning, 1938
 Lagrida rufa Jordan, 1894

References

Crossotini